A maid, or housemaid or maidservant, is a female domestic worker. In the Victorian era domestic service was the second largest category of employment in England and Wales, after agricultural work. In developed Western nations, full-time maids are now only found in the wealthiest households. In other parts of the world, maids remain common in urban middle-class households.

"" in Middle English meant an unmarried woman, especially a young one, or specifically a virgin.  These meanings lived on in English until recent times (and are still familiar from literature and folk music), alongside the sense of the word as a type of servant.

Description
In the contemporary Western world, comparatively few households can afford live-in domestic help, usually relying on cleaners, employed directly or through an agency (maid service). Today, a single maid may be the only domestic worker that upper-middle class households employ, as was historically the case.

In less developed nations, various factors ensure a labour source for domestic work: very large differences in the income of urban and rural households, widespread poverty, fewer educated women, and limited opportunities for the employment of less educated women.

Maids perform typical domestic chores such as laundry, ironing, cleaning the house, grocery shopping, cooking, and caring for household pets. They may also take care of children, although there are more specific occupations for this, such as nanny. In some poor countries, maids take care of the elderly and people with disabilities. Many maids are required by their employers to wear a uniform.

Legislation in many countries makes certain living conditions, working hours, or minimum wage a requirement of domestic service. Nonetheless, the work of a maid has always been hard, involving a full day, and extensive duties.

Europe
Maids were once part of an elaborate hierarchy in great houses, where the retinue of servants stretched up to the housekeeper and butler, responsible for female and male employees respectively. The word "maid" itself means an unmarried young woman or virgin. Domestic workers, particularly those low in the hierarchy, such as maids and footmen, were expected to remain unmarried while in service, and even highest-ranking workers such as butlers could be dismissed for marrying.

In Victorian England, all middle-class families would have "help", but for most small households, this would be only one employee, the maid of all work, often known colloquially as "the girl".

Historically, many maids suffered from prepatellar bursitis, an inflammation of the prepatellar bursa caused by long periods spent on the knees for purposes of scrubbing and fire-lighting, leading to the condition attracting the colloquial name of "housemaid's knee".

Asia

Foreign women are employed in Saudi Arabia, Kuwait, Qatar, Nigeria, Hong Kong, Japan and United Arab Emirates in large numbers to work as maids or other roles of domestic service, and are often vulnerable to multiple forms of abuse.

Southern Africa
In some areas in the region, the word "maid" is avoided. This is most likely due to the fact that it sounds like a racially derogatory term in Afrikaans. The Afrikaans word for a mite (small arachnid) has been used demeaningly to refer to women of colour. The English word for a friend, "mate", is also avoided for this reason.

Types

Maids traditionally have a fixed position in the hierarchy of the large households, and although there is overlap between definitions (dependent on the size of the household) the positions themselves would typically be rigidly adhered to. The usual classifications of maid in a large household are:

 Lady's maid: a senior servant who reported directly to the lady of the house, but ranked beneath the housekeeper, and accompanied her lady on travel. She took care of her mistress's clothes and hair, and sometimes served as confidante. 
 House-maid or housemaid: a generic term for maids whose function was chiefly "above stairs", and were usually a little older, and better paid. Where a household included multiple housemaids, the roles were often subdivided as below.
 Head house-maid: the senior house maid, reporting to the housekeeper. (Also called "house parlour maid" in an establishment with only one or two upstairs maids).
 Parlour maid: they cleaned and tidied reception rooms and living areas by morning, and often served refreshments at afternoon tea, and sometimes also dinner. They tidied studies and libraries, and (with footmen) answered bells calling for service.
 Chamber maid: they cleaned and maintained the bedrooms, ensured fires were lit in fireplaces, and supplied hot water.
 Laundry maid: they maintained bedding and towels. They also washed, dried, and ironed clothes for the whole household, including the servants.
 Under house parlour maid: the general deputy to the house parlour maid in a small establishment which had only two upstairs maids.
 Nursery maid: also an "upstairs maid", but one who worked in the children's nursery, maintaining fires, cleanliness, and good order. Reported to the nanny rather than the housekeeper.
 Kitchen maid: a "below stairs" maid who reported to the cook, and assisted in running the kitchens.
 Head kitchen maid: where multiple kitchen maids were employed, the "head kitchen maid" was effectively a deputy to the cook, engaged largely in the plainer and simpler cooking (sometimes cooking the servants' meals).
 Under kitchen maid: where multiple kitchen maids were employed, these were the staff who prepared vegetables, peeled potatoes, and assisted in presentation of finished cooking for serving.
 Scullery maid: the lowest grade of "below stairs" maid, reporting to the cook, the scullery maids were responsible for washing cutlery, crockery, and glassware, and scrubbing kitchen floors, as well as monitoring ovens while kitchen maids ate their own supper.
 Between maid, sometimes known as a "tweeny": roughly equivalent in status to scullery maids, and often paid less, between maids in a large household waited on the senior servants (butler, housekeeper, and cook) and were therefore answerable to all three department heads, often leading to friction in their employment.
 Still room maid: a junior maid employed in the still room; as the work involved the supply of alcohol, cosmetics, medicines, and cooking ingredients across all departments of the house, the still room maids were part of the "between staff", jointly answerable to all three department heads.

In more modest households, a single maid-of-all-work or skivvy was often the only staff. It is possible this word originates from the Italian for slave (""—"owned person").

In popular culture

One of the most in-depth and enduring representations of the lives of several types of maid was seen in the 1970s television drama Upstairs, Downstairs, set in England between 1903 and 1936. The lives of maids were well represented in the Downton Abbey series, set in England between 1912 and 1926 and shown from 2010 onward.

The American television drama The Gilded Age, set in the 1880s in New York City, depicts the lives of maids living and working in the great houses of the era.

The main characters in the NAMIC Vision Award-nominated television series Devious Maids are four housemaids.

See also
Au pair
Charwoman
Foreign domestic helpers in Hong Kong
French maid
Janitor
Servant

References

External links

Domestic work
Home economics
 
Gendered occupations
Cleaning and maintenance occupations